Lac de Migouélou is a lake in Hautes-Pyrénées, France. At an elevation of 2278 m, its surface area is 0.48 km².

Lakes of Hautes-Pyrénées